Jocara majuscula is a species of snout moth in the genus Jocara. It was described by Gottlieb August Wilhelm Herrich-Schäffer in 1871, and it is found in California, Florida, Central America, Cuba, Puerto Rico and Jamaica.

References

Moths described in 1871
Jocara